{{Automatic taxobox
| taxon = Marisediminicola
| authority = Li et al. 2010
| type_species = Marisediminicola antarctica
| type_species_authority = Li et al. 2010
| subdivision_ranks = Species
| subdivision =
 M. antarctica Li et al. 2010
 M. senii Jani et al. 2021
| synonyms = 
}}Marisediminicola is a genus of bacteria from the family of Microbacteriaceae. The type species, Marisediminicola antarctica'', has been isolated from marine sediments from the Zhongshan Station in Antarctica.

References

Microbacteriaceae
Bacteria genera
Monotypic bacteria genera